The Big Sleep is a 1939 novel by Raymond Chandler, its title being a euphemism for death

The Big Sleep may also refer to:

Film and television
 The Big Sleep (1946 film), an adaptation of the novel starring Humphrey Bogart and Lauren Bacall
 The Big Sleep (1978 film), another adaptation of the novel, starring Robert Mitchum and Joan Collins
 The Big Sleep, a British documentary about hypnotism, produced by Open Media for the TV series Equinox
 "The Big Sleep", an episode of the British television sitcom SunTrap
 "The Big Sleep", an episode of the Canadian animated TV series Total Drama Island
 “The Big Sleep”, an episode of Bear in the Big Blue House
 “The Big Sleep”, an episode of The Powerpuff Girls (2016)

Music
 The Big Sleep (band), an American indie rock/shoegaze band
 The Big Sleep (album), by The Only Ones
 "The Big Sleep", a song by Bat for Lashes and Scott Walker from Two Suns
 "The Big Sleep", a song by The Gathering from How to Measure a Planet?
 "The Big Sleep", a song by The Only Ones from Baby's Got a Gun
 "The Big Sleep", a song by Streetlight Manifesto from Everything Goes Numb
 "Big Sleep", a song by Simple Minds from New Gold Dream (81–82–83–84)